EBOB is a GABA receptor antagonist and neurotoxin.

See also
TBPS
IPTBO
TBPO
BIDN

References

Convulsants
GABAA receptor negative allosteric modulators
Ethynyl compounds
Orthoesters
Oxygen heterocycles